The enzyme oligogalacturonide lyase catalyzes the chemical reaction

4-(4-deoxy-β-D-gluc-4-enuronosyl)-D-galacturonate  2 5-dehydro-4-deoxy-D-glucuronate

This enzyme belongs to the family of lyases, specifically those carbon-oxygen lyases acting on polysaccharides.  The systematic name of this enzyme class is oligogalacturonide lyase. Other names in common use include oligogalacturonate lyase, unsaturated oligogalacturonate transeliminase, and OGTE.  This enzyme participates in pentose and glucuronate interconversions.

References

 

EC 4.2.2
Enzymes of unknown structure